Brusovo is the name of several rural localities in Russia:
Brusovo, Irkutsk Oblast, a settlement in Tayshetsky District of Irkutsk Oblast
Brusovo, Tver Oblast, a settlement in Brusovskoye Rural Settlement of Udomelsky District in Tver Oblast